Billo is a 1951 Punjabi, Pakistani film directed by Amjad Hussain and starring Darpan, M. Ismail, Nizam Din and Najma. 

Ghulam Ahmed Chishti composed the music with playback singers including Zubaida Khanum.This was the movie in which music director Ghulam Ahmed Chishti introduced
Zubaida Khanum into the Pakistan film industry. Actor Darpan made his debut in this film as well.

See also
 List of Pakistani Punjabi films

References

External links 

1951 films
Punjabi-language Pakistani films
Pakistani black-and-white films
1950s Punjabi-language films